Morning Phase is the twelfth official studio album and twelfth overall by American singer Beck. The album was released in February 2014 by his new label, Capitol Records. According to a press release, Morning Phase is a "companion piece" to Beck's 2002 album Sea Change. Almost every credited musician who recorded parts for Sea Change returned to record for Morning Phase, with the sole exception being Sea Change producer Nigel Godrich.

Upon release, the album received critical acclaim and was nominated for five awards at the 57th Annual Grammy Awards, winning three: Album of the Year, Best Engineered Album, Non-Classical and Best Rock Album. Beck performed the album's song "Heart Is a Drum" with Chris Martin at the ceremony.

Background
Beck's previous album, Modern Guilt, was released in 2008, and was the final album released under his Interscope Records contract. In the interim between album releases, Beck worked on a wide variety of projects, including new studio material, most of which went unreleased for several years. In October 2012, bassist and frequent collaborator Justin Meldal-Johnsen commented: "I would estimate that there are currently about three or four albums’ worth of material floating around," and Beck himself said that "I wasn't sure if I was going to put out a record – or if I should put out a record. It felt like I was standing still, while everything else was in such flux."

In 2012 and 2013, Beck began to perform live with more regularity than in the years immediately following the Modern Guilt tour. This period also saw new original material. The "I Just Started Hating Some People Today/Blue Randy" single was released in 2012, and he self-released the "Defriended", "I Won't Be Long", and "Gimme" singles in 2013. All three of these songs were standalone releases as 12-inch singles on his own FONOGRAF label. "I Won't Be Long" and "Gimme" were allegedly from an unfinished project from 2009, described as being similar to Odelay. According to Beck, the remaining songs from this project may see a similar release method.

In June 2013, Beck announced the expected release of two new albums for 2014, with one of the two being an "acoustic" album. The press release for the "acoustic" album (along with the news of his contract with Capitol Records) arrived in October 2013, announcing the title as Morning Phase and giving a February 2014 release window. The other still-unfinished album would be planned for a later release. In comparing the production of Morning Phase with his previous album, Beck stated that prior to recording Modern Guilt in 2008, he had suffered a serious spinal injury, and that the recording process for Modern Guilt was like "doing it with both hands tied behind your back. It hurt to sing. I'm whispering through half of those vocals." On the other hand, Beck said that Morning Phase was a much more satisfying experience: "Some of the songs on the new record – I get to shout and yell. I'm like, 'Thank you!' I had a lot of ideas and things I'd been wanting to do. This last year and a half, I feel like I can really do them."

Recording
In 2005, Beck began recording material in Nashville for a new album, but it remained incomplete for several years. It was not until 2012 that he returned to continue the project, this time recording at Third Man Records (which, incidentally had not existed at the time of his previous sessions). Two songs from these new sessions, "I Just Started Hating Some People Today" and "Blue Randy", were released that year as a non-album single on Third Man's Blue Series. Other songs, like "Blackbird Chain", "Country Down", and "Waking Light", were reserved for what would become Morning Phase. In the beginning of 2013, he recorded a great deal of the album in his hometown of Los Angeles in three days, with familiar studio and touring musicians Justin Meldal-Johnsen, Joey Waronker, Roger Joseph Manning, Jr., and Smokey Hormel. The next six months, Beck worked with this material for an album release. His father David Campbell contributed orchestral arrangements for the album, as he had done previously for Sea Change and most of Beck's other albums.

Promotion
On January 20, 2014, the album's first single, "Blue Moon", was released. Beck released the second single from the album, "Waking Light", on February 4, 2014. "Say Goodbye" was released as the third single in the United Kingdom on May 5, 2014. "Heart Is a Drum" was released to United States adult album alternative radio on July 28, 2014, as the fourth single.

Reception

Critical

Prior to its release, Morning Phase was placed at number two on Stereogum'''s list of most anticipated albums of 2014.

Upon its release, the album received acclaim from music critics. At Metacritic, which assigns a normalized rating out of 100 to reviews from mainstream critics, the album received an average score of 81 (based on 46 reviews), indicating "universal acclaim."

At Mojo, James McNair stated that "Morning Phase isn't an album that obsequiously courts your approval [...] it just does." Andy Gill of The Independent wrote that the album is "a deeply satisfying journey, the sadness tempered by the warmth and beauty of the settings, and the gentle determination of the resolution. Accordingly, it's a much better album than Sea Change, just as immersive, but wiser and less indulgently wallowing." According to Reef Younis of Clash magazine, Morning Phase has a "slight, melancholic tone", and "there's an awful lot to love." CraveOnline's Iann Robinson rated the album 9/10, calling it a "proud successor to Sea Change" and "downtempo stroke of genius", and noted that it was some of Beck's best work in years.

CommercialMorning Phase debuted at number three on the Billboard 200 albums chart, selling more than 87,000 in its first week, and becoming Beck's second highest charting album in the United States, after Guero (2005). The album also reached top 10 positions in the UK, Canada, Denmark, Switzerland, the Netherlands, Australia and New Zealand.

Track listing
All tracks written by Beck Hansen.

"Cycle" – 0:40
"Morning" – 5:20
"Heart Is a Drum" – 4:32
"Say Goodbye" – 3:30
"Blue Moon" – 4:03
"Unforgiven" – 4:35
"Wave" – 3:41
"Don't Let It Go" – 3:10
"Blackbird Chain" – 4:27
"Phase" – 1:08
"Turn Away" – 3:06
"Country Down" – 4:01
"Waking Light" – 5:01

Personnel
Musicians

Beck Hansen – vocals, acoustic guitar , keyboards , electric guitar , piano , sound collage , tambourine , electric bass , ukulele , charango , celeste , dulcimer , harmonica , synthesizers , glockenspiel , organ  
Joey Waronker – drums , percussion 
Roger Joseph Manning, Jr. – piano , synthesizers , background vocals , Rhodes , clavinet , B3 organ , electric piano  
Stanley Clarke – upright bass , electric bass 
Bram Inscore – electric bass 
Cody Kilby – guitar 
James Gadson – drums 
Fats Kaplin – banjo 
Justin Meldal-Johnsen – bass guitar 
Smokey Hormel – acoustic guitar , ebow , electric guitar  
Stephanie Bennett – harp 
Roger Waronker – piano 
Steve Richards – cello 
Greg Leisz – pedal steel guitar 
Jason Falkner – electric guitar 
Matt Mahaffey – organ 
Matt Sherrod – drums 

"Wave" strings

Joel Derouin – violin (concert master)
Charlie Besharat – violin
Mario De Leon – violin 
Julian Hallmark – violin
Gerry Hilera – violin
Razdan Kuyumjian – violin
Natalie Leggett – violin
Alyssa Park – violin
Tereza Stanislav – violin
Josefina Vergara – violin
Denyse Buffum – viola
Andew Duckles – viola
Matt Funes – viola
Steve Richards – first cello
Stefanie Fife  – cello
Rudy Stein – cello
David Stone – double bass

Album strings

Charlie Bisharat – violin (concert master)
Sara Parkins – violin (concert master)
Kevin Connolly – violin 
Julian Hallmark – violin 
Tammy Halwan – violin 
Natalie Leggett – violin 
Grace Oh – violin 
Michele Richards – violin 
Sarah Thornblade – violin 
Josefina Vergara – violin 
Nina Evtuhov – violin 
Songa Lee – violin 
Joel Pargman – violin 
Tereza Stainslav – violin 
Roland Kato – principal viola
Andrew Duckles – principal viola
Matt Funes – viola
Jeanie Lim – viola
John E. Acosta – principal cello
Steve Richards – principal cello
Rudolph Stein – cello
Suzie Katayama – cello
David Stone – principal bass

Technical

Beck Hansen – producer
David Campbell – conductor, orchestrations
Darrell Thorp – engineer
Cole Marsden – engineer
Greif Neill – engineer
Cassidy Turbin – engineer
David "Elevator" Greenbaum – engineer
Florian Lagatta – engineer
Joe Visciano – engineer
Robbie Nelson – engineer
Tom Elmhirst – mixing
Ben Baptie – mixing assistant
Bob Ludwig – mastering
Andy West – design
Dan Moutford – initial cover layout
Autumn de Wilde – photography
Dennis Hallinan – city street image

Accolades

Upon receiving Album of the Year, Morning Phase also beat out Pharrell Williams's G I R L, Beyoncé's self-titled album, Sam Smith's In the Lonely Hour, and Ed Sheeran's x''.

Charts and certifications

Weekly charts

Year-end charts

Certifications

Release history

References

2014 albums
Beck albums
Capitol Records albums
Grammy Award for Best Rock Album
Grammy Award for Album of the Year
Grammy Award for Best Engineered Album, Non-Classical
Albums arranged by David Campbell (composer)
Albums produced by Beck